= ShowDocument =

- Developer(s): HBR Labs
- Operating system: Microsoft Windows, Mac OS, Linux
- Type: Collaborative web application
- Website: www.showdocument.net

ShowDocument is an online web application that allows multiple users to conduct web meetings, upload, share and review documents from remote locations. The service was developed by the HBR Labs company, established in 2007.

== Features ==
Users can collaborate on and review documents in real time, with annotations and text being visible to all users and accessible for co-editing. The idea of every user being able to annotate can cause conflicts within the sessions, and so main navigation options are under the "presenter"'s control - which can be given to a different user as well. An earlier version of the application, by contrast, had allowed all users to navigate and edit at once, causing the system to drop all incomplete edits.

It is possible to draw and write on a virtual whiteboard, and to stream a YouTube video to a group in full synchronization. A feature also exists for co-browsing of Google Maps. Entering an open session in the application can be done with a given code number, or by receiving a link through an Email message. Different file formats can be uploaded and saved either online or offline, such as PDF. A PDF file's text cannot be edited - text is edited through the separate text editor. Although the platform contains a text chat, it is not intended to replace instant messaging software, as there are no extensive messaging features. The application has a paid and free version, with the free version having a few limitations: audio and video options are disabled, number of participants is limited and sessions are time-limited.

== Development ==
ShowDocument was first developed in 2007. On September 8, 2009, HBR labs released a new update which included features such as secure online document storage and mobile device support.
